Sougé may refer to the following places in France:

Sougé, Indre, a commune in the Indre department 
Sougé, Loir-et-Cher, a commune in the Loir-et-Cher department